Radical 125 or radical old meaning "" is one of the 29 Kangxi radicals (214 radicals in total) composed of 6 strokes.

In the Kangxi Dictionary, there are 22 characters (out of 49,030) to be found under this radical.

 is also the 123rd indexing component in the Table of Indexing Chinese Character Components predominantly adopted by Simplified Chinese dictionaries published in mainland China, with  being its associated indexing component.

Evolution

Derived characters

Literature

External links

Unihan Database - U+8001

125
123